The Tupolev Tu-123 Yastreb (Hawk) was one of the earliest Soviet reconnaissance drones that began development in 1960. Sometimes referred to as the "DBR-1", it was introduced into active service in 1964.

Design
The Tu-123 was a long-range, high-altitude supersonic strategic unmanned reconnaissance aircraft, in a form reminiscent of a big dart, conceptually somewhat similar to the United States' D-21. It carried both film cameras and SIGINT payloads.

The Tu-123 was ground-launched with JATO boosting and powered by a KR-15 afterburning turbojet in flight. The KR-15 was a lower-cost, short-life, expendable version of the R-15 engine used on the twin-engine, Mach 3-class Mikoyan-Gurevich MiG-25 Foxbat interceptor. The Tu-123 itself was expendable, parachuting its payload to the ground for recovery.

History

Development
The Tu-123 was a development of the proposed Tupolev Tu-121 supersonic nuclear-armed cruise missile program. After the cancellation of that project in favor of ballistic missiles, the design was modified for a high-altitude reconnaissance role. The project was officially launched on 16 August 1960, under the designation “DBR-1” with the Tupolev Design Bureau designation of “I123K” (later changed to “Tu-123”). Factory testing was completed in September 1961 and flight tests by December 1963. The new UAV entered active service on 23 May 1964.
Mass production was at Voronezh Factory Number 64, and from 1964–1972 a total of 52 units were manufactured.

Operational history
The Tu-123 served with Soviet Air Force intelligence units stationed in the western border military districts until 1979. It had (theoretically) the range to cover all of Central and Western Europe, and performed well in training exercises. However, the expense of operating an expendable system was unsatisfactory. This led to the development of the Tu-139 Yastreb 2, a reusable version which could land on unprepared airstrips. It was never put into production.

The Tu-123 was gradually removed from service, and replaced by the MiG-25R, a reconnaissance version of the Foxbat.

Specifications

References

This article contains material that originally came from the web article Unmanned Aerial Vehicles by Greg Goebel, which exists in the Public Domain.

Tu-0123
1960s Soviet military reconnaissance aircraft
Unmanned aerial vehicles of the Soviet Union
Single-engined jet aircraft
Aircraft first flown in 1960
Mid-wing aircraft